PHS1 may refer to:
 PTGS1, an enzyme
 Very-long-chain (3R)-3-hydroxyacyl-(acyl-carrier protein) dehydratase, an enzyme
 Beta-phellandrene synthase (neryl-diphosphate-cyclizing), an enzyme